Dasypoda argentata is a species of insect belonging to the family Melittidae.

It is native to Europe.

References

Melittidae
Insects described in 1808